The Royal Masonic School for Boys was an English private school for boys at Bushey in Hertfordshire.

History
The origins of the school lie in the charities established in the late 18th century to clothe and educate the sons of Freemasons near their homes. These charities amalgamated in 1852 and established a boys' school at Wood Green in North London in 1857. The foundation stone for a new school in Bushey was laid by the Duke of Connaught and Strathearn. It was designed by Gordon & Gunton and completed in 1903. A Junior School was added on the other side of The Avenue in 1929 and by 1939 there were 800 boys at the school.

Following a decline in pupil numbers the junior school closed in 1970, with the senior school closing in 1977. The site of the junior school is now occupied by The Grange Academy. The Royal Masonic School for Girls, based at Rickmansworth, Hertfordshire, was unaffected by the closure.

The site was acquired by Comer Homes in 1998; the buildings were rented out to the United States International University (Europe) (later Alliant International University) until 2009 when Comer Homes began redeveloping the site as Royal Connaught Park.

Notable alumni

 Anthony Andrews – Actor
 Percy Jack Clayson – First World War Fighter Ace
 David Davies (football administrator) – The Football Association Director, Broadcaster and Author
 Richard Evans – Businessman
 Robin Gibson – Art Historian
 Gavin Hamilton (British Army officer) – Military Cross (Posthumously Awarded)
 Sir Stuart Hampson – Chairman, John Lewis Partnership
 Richard Holme – British Liberal Democrat Politician
 Air Vice-Marshal Frederick Charles Hurrell – Director-General Of The RAF Medical Services From 1986 to 1988
 Richard Lewis – Dean of Wells From 1990 To 2003
 Paul Pickering – Writer
 Charles Phillips - Archaeologist in charge of the excavation of Sutton Hoo burial ship.
 Harvey Postlethwaite – Formula One Designer
 Brent Sadler – CNN News Reporter in the Middle East
 Harry Leonard Shorto – British linguist
 D. R. Thorpe – Political Biographer
 Ernest Warburton – Musicologist
 Simon Roderick Warr - BBC radio broadcaster, television personality, writer and former teacher. 
 Brian Wenham – Television and Radio Administration

In popular culture
Both the senior and junior school were commonly used for films such as Monty Python's The Meaning of Life, Lucky Jim, Indiana Jones and the Last Crusade from the 1950s until recently. The opening scenes of the children's series, Thunderbirds was filmed in the old science block. The senior school and its grounds were used throughout the long running series of Judge John Deed starring Martin Shaw employing the teaching block as the judges's chambers and other parts of the senior school for the in-court scenes. The interior was used for the 1990 comedy Nuns on the Run.

References

External links
Memoirs of a student at the junior school 1949–1953
Memoirs of a student at the schools 1965–1974
Various old photos of the Boys schools
Blog about life at the junior school 1961–1965

Defunct schools in Hertfordshire
Boys' schools in Hertfordshire
Boarding schools in Hertfordshire
Freemasonry in England
Masonic educational institutions in the United Kingdom
People educated at the Royal Masonic School for Boys
Educational institutions established in 1903
1903 establishments in England
Educational institutions disestablished in 1977
1977 disestablishments in England